Zerhoun ( also spelled Zarhun or Zarhon) is a mountain in Morocco, north of Meknes. On the hill is the Moulay Idris Zerhoun town, named after Moulay Idris I, the founder of the Idrisid dynasty who was buried there in 791 AD.

Geography
Near the Zerhoun range are the ruins of Volubilis, once the Roman provincial capital, and the first home of Idris I. It was settled by Phoenicians or Carthaginians prior to the conclusion of the Punic Wars, when it was annexed by Rome. After the withdrawal of Rome, Christian Berbers continued to inhabit Volubilis until the seventh century AD (Bidwell, 2005). Volubilis has been designated as a World Heritage Site. Also nearby is the town of Moulay Idriss Zerhoun, site of the mausoleum of Idris I.

See also
Bou Assel
Meknès-El Menzeh
Volubilis

References

External links

Mountains of Morocco
Meknès Prefecture
Geography of Fès-Meknès